Epichnopterix sieboldii is a moth of the family Psychidae. It is found in parts of central Europe, France, Spain and Greece.

The wingspan of the males is 10–14 mm. Females are wingless. Adult males are on wing from the beginning of April to the end of March.

The larvae feed on various herbaceous plants.

References

Moths described in 1853
Psychidae
Moths of Europe